The Aurus Komendant is a luxury SUV produced by Russian automaker Aurus Motors and developed by NAMI in Moscow, Russia. It is named after the name of the Komendantskaya Tower of the Moscow Kremlin. The Komendant is part of the Kortezh series of luxury vehicles, which includes the Senat limousine and the Arsenal minivan.

Production was planned for the end of 2020; later these plans were postponed to 2022 and later 2023. The official plan for year 2023 for the SUV is 200 cars. The car's appearance has been compared to that of the Rolls-Royce Cullinan, with tail lights comparable to the Bentley Bentayga's.

References

External links
 Aurus Motors

Upcoming car models
Hybrid electric cars
Luxury sport utility vehicles
Cars of Russia
All-wheel-drive vehicles
Aurus vehicles